Madure railway station is a train station on the Konkan Railway. It is at a distance of  down from origin. The preceding station on the line is Sawantwadi Road railway station and the next station is Pernem railway station. This station is the last Konkan Railway station in Maharashtra.

The station offers free Wi-Fi.

References

Railway stations along Konkan Railway line
Railway stations in Sindhudurg district
Ratnagiri railway division